Jaime Santos Latasa (born 3 July 1996) is a Spanish chess player. He was awarded the title of Grandmaster by FIDE in 2018.

Chess career 
Santos became a FIDE Master in 2011 and an International Master with effect from 15 August 2013. He was the Spanish U10 champion in 2006, the Spanish U12 champion in 2008 and the Spanish U14 champion in 2010. He was 19th in the San Sebastian Open 2009. He placed =3rd (4th on tiebreak) at the European U18 Junior Championship in 2014. 

He led the Dubai Open Chess Tournament in 2017 with 5.5 points after 6 rounds, although finishing the tournament with a 20th place with 6.0/9.

, Santos is the 3rd best Spanish player.

On December 18th 2022 Santos won the 2022 European Championship in Rapid Chess with a score of 9,5 out of 11 points.

References

External links
 
 
 
 

1996 births
Living people
Chess grandmasters
Spanish chess players
Sportspeople from San Sebastián